Kırık Hayatlar (Broken Lives) is a 1965 Turkish drama film, directed by Halit Refiğ and starring Belgin Doruk, Cüneyt Arkın, and Nebahat Çehre. It is based on the novel with the same name from Halid Ziya Uşaklıgil. Another version TV series was released in 2021, starring Meltem Akçöl, Murat Onuk and Burcu Almeman. 

In Orhan Pamuk's novel The Museum of Innocence the main character finances a movie based on  Broken Lives, which is described as "a tale of love and family ties in the Ottoman mansions of the Westernized bourgeoisie and the imperial elite".

Life and writings

References

External links

1965 films
Turkish drama films
1965 drama films
Films directed by Halit Refiğ
Turkish black-and-white films